Maloabdrashitovo (Bäläkäy Äbdräşit) is a rural locality (a village) in Abdrashitovsky Selsoviet, Alsheyevsky District, Bashkortostan, Russia.  As of 2010, the population was 42. There is only 1 street.

Geography 
Maloabdrashitovo is located 25 km east of Rayevsky (the district's administrative centre) by road. Krymsky is the nearest rural locality.

References 

Rural localities in Alsheyevsky District